The British Asian Rugby Association (BARA) is a rugby governing body, encompassing both rugby union and rugby league, for British players of Asian descent. It was spearheaded by Ikram Butt, a former England rugby league and Pakistan rugby union international.

There is a BARA team that takes part in various tournaments, such as the All India and South Asian rugby union championships, which they won in 2005.  The team also provides a number of players to the Pakistan national rugby union team.

External links
 British Asian Rugby Association

Pakistani diaspora in the United Kingdom
Rugby league governing bodies
Rugby union in Pakistan
Rugby union governing bodies in England